"Booo!" is a song by UK garage DJ/producer Sticky featuring Ms. Dynamite. It was the first single Ms. Dynamite appeared on before the release of her debut solo single the following year. The song was a top 20 hit, peaking at No. 12 on the UK Singles Chart and No. 1 on the UK Dance Singles Chart.

The Guardian listed the song at number 19 in their list of "The best UK garage tracks - ranked!" in 2019.

Mixmag included "Booo!" in their list of "40 of the best UK garage tracks released from 1995 to 2005".

Gemtracks included the song in their list of the "top UK garage songs between 1995–2005".

Track listing
UK 12" single
A1. "Booo!" (Original Dirty Mix) – 5:26
A2. "Booo!" (Medieval Hooligans Longshanks Remix) – 4:57
B. "Booo!" (Audio Drives Midi Madness Mix) – 6:53

UK CD maxi-single
 "Booo!" (Original Dirty Mix) – 5:26
 "Booo!" (Medieval Hooligans Longshanks Remix) – 4:57
 "Booo!" (Dubaholics Numb Dub Mix Edit) – 5:14
 "Booo!" (Headquarters Acoustic Radio Remix) – 3:17

Charts

References

2001 songs
2001 singles
Ms. Dynamite songs
UK garage songs
Songs written by Ms. Dynamite
FFRR Records singles